The Australian national cricket team played 3 Tests series against Pakistan in October 2002. Originally scheduled to take place in Pakistan, but it was changed to a neutral venue after 2002 Karachi bus bombing. This was done in consultation with Foreign Minister Alexander Downer and Prime Minister John Howard.

The first test was played in Sri Lanka and the other two were played in the UAE. Australians won the series 3-0.

Test series

1st Test

2nd Test

3rd Test

References 

2002 in Pakistani cricket
2002 in Australian cricket
Australian cricket tours of Pakistan